Owyhee Reservoir State Airport  is a public airport located 25 miles (40 km) southwest of Owyhee, in Malheur County, Oregon, United States.

See also
 Owyhee Reservoir

External links

Airports in Malheur County, Oregon